Temur Kabisashvili (born 13 September 1967) is a retired Georgian professional football player.

External links
 
 

1967 births
Living people
Soviet footballers
Footballers from Georgia (country)
Expatriate footballers from Georgia (country)
Expatriate footballers in Russia
Georgia (country) international footballers
FC Dinamo Tbilisi players
FC Dynamo Barnaul players
Association football defenders